Idioteuthis famelica is a species of whip-lash squid.

External links

 Tree of Life web project: Idioteuthis famelica

Whip-lash squid